Makalu  is a village development committee near the mountain of the same name, located in Sankhuwasabha District in the Koshi Zone of north-eastern Nepal. At the time of the 1991 Nepal census it had a population of 3,560 people living in 694 individual households.

See also
 Barun Valley

References

External links
UN map of the municipalities of Sankhuwasabha District

Populated places in Sankhuwasabha District